Sülysáp is a town in Pest County, Hungary about  southeast of Budapest. In 1950 two villages, Tápiósáp and Tápiósüly, amalgamated, but they separated in 1954. In 1970 they combined again to form Sülysáp.

Geography
Sülysáp is in the Lower Tápió Valley of the Gödöllő hills. In this picturesque location, surrounded by beautiful low hills and good terrain, the Lower Tápió and Sápi streams add to making  the town a beauty spot.

Communications
Primary route 31 serves the town by road.

Express and stopping trains of the Hungarian State Railways serve the town on suburban line 120a (Budapest–Újszász–Szolnok) at the main station (Sülysáp) and a smaller station halt (Szőlősnyaralö). "Szőlősnyaralö" is best translated as "Vineyard retreat"; the village was built as holiday homes for workers from Budapest. Over the years these holiday homes have been converted and extended and are used as main homes.

The nearest airport is the main international airport for the capital, Budapest-Ferihegy.

Economy
There are around 360 small and medium enterprises in the town, providing the livelihood of a large segment of the population.

After the collapse of the collective farming system, the lands around Sülysáp were privatized, and farmers became self-employed. The Agricultural Service Co-op was founded not long after, and currently leases almost half of the land from the owners, with a large number of members.

Other companies employing significant numbers of people include Ebm. Local government services also employ many people.

Landmarks
The Roman Catholic Church of Our Lady, built in 1489 in Gothic style.
The Sőtér Castle, built by the Sőtér family of landed gentry in 1725.
The Grassalkovich shooting lodge, visited by Sándor Petőfi during the Hungarian Revolution of 1848.
The life-size statue of Saint Stephen on Saint Stephen Square.
The statue of the Holy Trinity.
The statue of Saint John of Nepomuk.
The House of Prayer of the Pentecostal Church.
The Italian memorial by the Fiume Studies Society, in remembrance of the 129  Italian citizens who died at Tápiósüly (now part of Sülysap) in the internment camp.
The statue of a girl holding a peacock.

Gallery

Twin towns - twin cities
  Innsbruck – Austria
  Plymouth – United Kingdom
  Sânmartin – Romania

References

External links
 vendegaron.hu Sülysáp at portal "Vendégvárón" 
 Sülysáp.lap.hu  Sülysáp at portal "Starlap" 
 1hungary.com Sülysáp information at 1hungary.com 
 nagyvodely.hu Churches in Sülysáp 

Populated places in Pest County
Grassalkovich family